Soleidys José Rengel Marcano (born 3 December 1993) is a Venezuelan footballer who plays as a defender for Monagas SC and the Venezuela women's national team.

International career
Rengel represented Venezuela at the 2010 FIFA U-17 Women's World Cup. At senior level, she played two Copa América Femenina editions (2010 and 2014) and two Central American and Caribbean Games editions (2014 and 2018).

References

1993 births
Living people
Women's association football fullbacks
Women's association football central defenders
Venezuelan women's footballers
People from Maturín
Venezuela women's international footballers
Competitors at the 2014 Central American and Caribbean Games
Central American and Caribbean Games bronze medalists for Venezuela
Competitors at the 2018 Central American and Caribbean Games
Deportivo Anzoátegui players
Cortuluá footballers
Monagas S.C. players
Venezuelan expatriate women's footballers
Venezuelan expatriate sportspeople in Colombia
Expatriate women's footballers in Colombia
Central American and Caribbean Games medalists in football